This table lists famous individual trees in the genus Eucalyptus.

See also 

List of individual trees

References 

Eucalypt trees